"5 O'Clock Charlie" was the 26th episode of the M*A*S*H television series, and second of season two. The episode aired on September 22, 1973.

Plot
For six weeks, an ammo dump near the camp has been the target of a punctual but inept North Korean bomber pilot. Every afternoon at 5:00, he flies overhead and attempts to hit the dump with a single hand-thrown bomb. The pilot, nicknamed "5 O'Clock Charlie," has been so reliably unsuccessful that the denizens of the 4077th have begun a daily betting pool based on how far away from the target his bomb will land. Only Frank and Margaret regard Charlie as a serious threat. Frank gets Henry to request an anti-aircraft gun, and Brigadier General Crandall Clayton (Herb Voland) comes to the camp to assess the situation. Clayton, who has placed the dump near the hospital so that the enemy will leave it alone, is initially skeptical of the need for a gun. When Charlie's next bomb destroys Clayton's jeep, though, he agrees to send the gun.

Frank takes charge of the gun and begins to train three South Korean soldiers in its use, but Hawkeye and Trapper mock him and argue that the gun's presence will draw enemy fire toward the hospital. Prompted by the camp dentist, Captain Phil Cardozo (Corey Fischer), Hawkeye and Trapper begin devising plans to get rid of the dump and thus remove the need for the gun. They dye sheets with mercurochrome to make a target for Charlie to hit; after he misses yet again, they confuse Frank's men into aiming and firing the gun directly at the dump to destroy it. Charlie stops his daily raids, and the staff of the 4077th return to their routine duties.

Production
A Ryan PT-22 painted with North Korean markings was used for Charlie's plane. The plane used was owned by Don Burkett, who kept the plane in a hangar at Long Beach Airport. The production team painted over the plane's orange and white starburst pattern with special paint to resemble the North Korean markings. Burkett himself actually flew the plane from the rear seat, as the pilot who was assigned to do the flying had never flown a plane of this type before (Burkett can be seen hunched over in the back seat during some shots). Enough film was taken during the one day of flying they were able to piece together two episodes featuring the plane and its inept pilot. An article in the October 1972 edition of Private Pilot magazine featured Burkett's experience doing the show. The magazine's cover has a picture of what the plane looked like when it wasn't "in costume".

The character of 5 O'Clock Charlie returns in the Season 3 episode "There Is Nothing Like a Nurse", in which the nursing staff is evacuated based on intelligence that points to an upcoming air raid on the 4077. In the end, the "air raid" turns out to be 5 O'Clock Charlie, this time armed with propaganda leaflets.

Notes

During the U.S. Pacific campaign of World War II—specifically, during the Guadalcanal campaign (1942–1943)—Japanese bombers would harass various U.S. Army Air Force bases at night to deprive personnel of sleep. American troops nicknamed these bombers with various related nicknames, such as "5 O'Clock Charlie", "Bed-Check Charlie" or "Washing-Machine Charlie". Various methods of harassment included overflights at full throttle with propellers at near-flat pitch, or deliberately unsynchronized engines.

One Washing-Machine Charlie appeared in the U.S. television comedy series McHale's Navy. Washing Machine Charlie was also discussed in Gregory Boyington's autobiography and made appearances in Black Sheep Squadron, the television show loosely based on Boyington's World War II exploits.

References

External links

M*A*S*H (season 2) episodes
1973 American television episodes